Erling Jepsen (born 14 May 1956 in Gram, Denmark) is a Danish author and playwright whose output primarily deals with his hometime of Gram and the culture in the surrounding region of Southern Jutland. His novel Frygtelig lykkelig (Terribly Happy) was adapted into the 2008 neo-noir thriller Terribly Happy, and his autobiographical novel Kunsten at Græde i Kor (The Art of Crying) was adapted into the 2006 film The Art of Crying.

Jepsen won the 2004 Holberg Medal for his contributions to Danish drama.

Selected bibliography

 2002: The Art of Crying in Harmony (novel)
 2004: Terribly Happy (novel)
 2006: With Kind Regards (novel)
 2013: The South Jutlandic Farm (novel)
 2016: Gram Sea (novel)

References

20th-century Danish dramatists and playwrights
1956 births
People from Haderslev Municipality
Living people
Danish male novelists
Danish male dramatists and playwrights
20th-century Danish novelists
21st-century Danish novelists
20th-century Danish male writers
21st-century Danish male writers
Nordic Noir writers